Roger de Toriz  was Dean of Exeter between 1268 and 1274.

Notes

Deans of Exeter